La Selve may refer to the following places in France:

 La Selve, Aisne, a commune in the department of Aisne
 La Selve, Aveyron, a commune in the department of Aveyron